Mesoreodon is an extinct genus of terrestrial herbivore of the family Merycoidodontidae, subfamily Merycoidodontinae (the oreodonts), endemic to North America during the Whitneyan stage of the Oligocene-Miocene epochs (33—20.6 mya) existing for approximately .

Morphology
It was a large animal and ate the numerous low-growing plants and early grasses that sprung up on the plains of North America. It had a rather robust jaw, and like all oreodonts, sharp canine teeth.

Unlike many other oreodonts, who were restricted to certain habitats and places, Mesoreodon seemed to have been a cosmopolite. Fossils of Mesoreodon have been found in the Miocene deserts of California, the prairies of Nebraska, Wyoming, and South Dakota, southeastern Idaho, John Day Fossil Beds in Oregon, and Florida. In fact, Mesoreodon is the only Florida oreodont known from a complete skeleton, odd, since oreodonts had a continent-wide dominance until their extinction. They lived in all environments, and must have been very adaptable.

Mesoreodon had ossified vocal cords; the only other animal to have these in modern times is the howler monkey. Mesoreodon may have been a "screaming oreodont" using loud noises to intimidate its enemies and rivals.

References

Additional References
San Diego Museum of Natural History
Idaho Museum of Natural History, Collections

Oreodonts
Miocene even-toed ungulates
White River Fauna
Fossil taxa described in 1893
Prehistoric even-toed ungulate genera